This is a list of operatic sopranos and mezzo-sopranos who were born in Finland or whose work is closely associated with that country.

A
Aino Ackté (1878–1944), celebrated international soprano, performed at the Paris Opera, Metropolitan Opera and Covent Garden, co-founder of the Finnish Opera
Emmy Achté (1859–1924), mezzo-soprano, first prima donna of the Finnish Opera from 1873 to 1878, thereafter voice teacher
Alexandra Ahnger (1859–1940), mezzo-soprano with the Finnish Opera, soloist, voice teacher

B
Ida Basilier-Magelssen (1846–1928), soprano in concerts and opera, active in the Royal Swedish Opera and the Finnish Theatre

E
Maaria Eira (1924–1999), soprano performing in Italian opera and in musical films, later opera director
Emma Engdahl-Jägerskiöld (1852–1930), soprano active in opera at Helsinki's Swedish Theatre, also sang in Stockholm and Oslo

F
Alma Fohström (1856–1936), popular operatic soprano, performing leading roles in opera houses around the world, including the Metropolitan Opera and the Bolshoi Theatre
Elin Fohström (1868–1949), soprano, performed in Finland, Russia, the Baltic countries, Germany and Italy until 1897, thereafter voice teacher in Helsinki

G
Hanna Granfelt (1884–1952), soprano, successful in the early 20th century in Germany and later at the Finnish National Opera working with Sibelius
Monica Groop (born 1958), mezzo-soprano with the Finnish National Opera, guest in Los Angeles, Paris, London and Salzburg

H
Katherine Haataja (born 1969), mezzo-soprano, formerly active in opera houses across Europe, now supports young singers though Operosa
Anna Hagelstam (1883–1946), mezzo.soprano opera singer and song writer

I
Soile Isokoski (born 1957), lyric soprano in opera and concerts, performances across Europe and North America

J
Maikki Järnefelt (1871–1929), soprano remembered for her Wagnerian opera roles in Germany and Sweden and as a lied singer
Helena Juntunen (born 1976), soprano with the Finnish National Opera, international soloist

K
Anu Komsi (born 1967), soprano performing in opera houses across Germany, international soloist with major orchestras

L
Sofia Liljegren (1765–1795), Finnish-Swedish soprano who was a popular performer at the Royal Swedish Opera in the 1780s
Tamara Lund (1941–2005), soprano, performed at the Finnish National Opera and at the Staatstheater in Munich

M
Karita Mattila (born 1960), celebrated international operatic soprano, active mainly in Finland, Germany and the United States
Johanna Nurmimaa (born 1962), actress and soprano singer, soubrette and light lyric opera roles

N
Camilla Nylund (born 1968), dramatic lyric soprano performing mainly in German opera houses

P
Lilli Paasikivi (born 1965), mezzo-soprano, international opera singer and soloist, artistic director of the Finnish National Opera

R
Aulikki Rautawaara (1906–1990), soprano, remembered for singing works by Grieg and Sibelius, performed at Glyndebourne and in Europe's major opera houses
Pia Ravenna (1894–1964), celebrated coloratura soprano, performed at the Finnish National Opera in 32 operas and operettas, also in Monte Carlo, Egypt and Italy

S
Johanna von Schoultz (1813–1863), soprano, performed at opera houses in Italy and at the Italian Opera in Paris

T
Tuuli Takala (born 1987), classical singer and operatic soprano, active in Finland and in many of Europe's leading opera houses
Irma Tervani (1887–1936), mezzo-soprano with the Finnish Opera and the Dresden Royal Opera

U
Irma Urrila (born 1943), soprano, performed mainly in Helsinki, Oslo and Stockholm, known for her role as Pamina in Ingmar Bergman's film of Mozart's The Magic Flute

V
Taru Valjakka (born 1938), soprano, performed leading roles in the Finnish National Opera in the 1970s, also lied recitalist
Anita Välkki (1926–2011), dramatic soprano, international career in major roles at leading opera houses, voice teacher from 1982

References

operatic sopranos
Finnish operatic sopranos
Finnish operatic sopranos